Adriana Jelinkova (born as Jelínková, 10 April 1995 in Brno, Czech Republic) is an originally Dutch alpine ski racer since 2022/2023 representing Czech republic. Jelinkova specializes in the technical events of giant slalom and slalom. Jelinkova made her World Cup debut on 16 December 2012 and represented the Netherlands at WOG in Beijing in 2022. In May 2022, she changed her Nationality from the Netherlands to the Czech Republic.

Career
Jelinkova made her World Cup debut on 16 December 2012 in the Courchevel giant slalom, but she failed to finish the first run. She competed for the Netherlands at the 2013 Alpine World Ski Championships in Schladming, Austria. She finished 40th in the giant slalom. She competed at the 2015 Alpine World Ski Championships in Vail / Beaver Creek, United States. She did not start the first run of the slalom. She competed at the 2017 Alpine World Ski Championships in St. Moritz, Switzerland. She finished 36th in the giant slalom and 30th in the slalom. She competed at the 2019 Alpine World Ski Championships in Åre, Sweden. She finished 33rd in the giant slalom and 19th in the slalom.

World Cup results

Results per discipline

Standings through 18 March 2022

World Championships results

References

External links
 
 

1995 births
Dutch female alpine skiers
Living people
Sportspeople from Brno
Dutch people of Czech descent
Alpine skiers at the 2012 Winter Youth Olympics
Alpine skiers at the 2022 Winter Olympics
Olympic alpine skiers of the Netherlands